St Michael, Cornhill, is a medieval parish church in the City of London with pre-Norman Conquest parochial foundation. It lies in the ward of Cornhill. The medieval structure was lost in the Great Fire of London, and replaced by the present building, traditionally attributed to Sir Christopher Wren. The upper parts of the tower are by Nicholas Hawksmoor. The church was embellished by Sir George Gilbert Scott and Herbert Williams in the nineteenth century.

Early history
The church of St Michael, Cornhill is sited directly above the location of the western apse of the former London Roman basilica (built c. AD90-AD120). Although its walls are not aligned with the basilica, some of the church's foundations still sit directly on top of the roman foundations.

The first reference to the church was in 1055, when Alnod the priest gifted it to the Abbey of Evesham, "Alnod sacerdos dedit ecclesiam, beati Michaelis in Cornhulle, London".

The patronage remained in the possession of the Abbot and convent of Evesham until 1503, when it was settled on the Drapers' Company. A new tower was built in 1421, possibly after a fire. John Stow described the church as "fair and beautiful, but since the surrender of their lands to Edward VI, greatly blemished by the building of four tenements on the north side thereof, in the place of a green church-yard". On the south side of the church was a churchyard with what Stow calls a "proper cloister", with lodgings for choristers, and a pulpit cross, at which sermons were preached. These were maintained by Sir John Rudstone, after whose death in 1530 the choir was dissolved and the cross fell into decay. Churchwardens' accounts and other memoranda of the medieval and Tudor church are in print, and the parish registers from 1546 to 1754 are published by the Harleian Society.

A folk tale, dating from the early 16th century, tells of a team of bellringers who once saw 'an ugly shapen sight' appear as they were ringing the bells during a storm. They fell unconscious, but later discovered scratch marks in the masonry. For years afterward these were pointed out as the 'Devil's clawmarks'.

Rebuilding after the Great Fire

The medieval church, except for the tower, was destroyed in the Great Fire of London in 1666; the present building was begun in 1672. The design is traditionally attributed to Sir Christopher Wren. However, the authors of the Buildings of England guide to the City churches believe Wren's office had no involvement with the rebuilding of the body of the church, the parish having dealt directly with the builders. The new church was 83 feet long and 67 feet wide, divided into nave and aisles by Doric columns, with a groined ceiling. There was an organ at the west end, and a reredos with paintings of Moses and Aaron at the east. The walls, George Godwin noted, did not form right angles, indicating the re-use of the medieval foundations.

The fifteenth-century tower, having proved unstable, was demolished in 1704 by order of the archbishop. A replacement, 130 feet high, was completed in 1721. In contrast to the main body of the church it was built in a Gothic style, in imitation of that of Magdalen College, Oxford. Construction had begun in 1715, with money from the coal fund. The designer of the lower stages was probably William Dickinson, working in Christopher Wren's office. Funds proved inadequate, and work stopped in 1717 with the tower half-completed. The tower was eventually completed in 1722 with the aid of a grant from the Commission for Building Fifty New Churches, the upper stages being to the designs of its surveyor, Nicholas Hawksmoor. The tower terminates in four elaborately panelled turrets, resembling those of King's College Chapel,  Cambridge.

Repairs were made to the church in 1751, 1775, and 1790, the last two of which were done under the survey of George Wyatt. In the 1790 repairs, the south aisle windows and the east window were made circular; as well, a new pulpit, desk, altar rail, east window glass, and 12 new brass branches were added.

Victorian alterations
In the late 1850s, the Drapers' Company, motivated by legislation that would have forced them to hand certain funds over to the Ecclesiastical Commissioners if they were not spent on St Michael's, decided to fund a lavish scheme of embellishment, and asked George Gilbert Scott to carry out the work.

Scott demolished a house that had stood against the tower, replacing it with an elaborate porch, built in the "Franco-Italian Gothic" style (1858–1860), facing towards Cornhill. It is decorated with carving by John Birnie Philip, including  a high-relief tympanum sculpture depicting "St Michael disputing with Satan". Scott inserted Gothic tracery into the circular clerestory windows, and into the plain round-headed windows on the south side of the church. New side windows were created in the chancel, and an elaborate stone reredos, incorporating the paintings of Moses and Aaron by Robert Streater from its predecessor, was constructed in an Italian Gothic style. A contemporary account of the work explained that this was appropriate since "the classical feeling which pervades the Italian school of Gothic art enabled the architect to bring the classical features of the building into harmony with the Gothic treatment which our present sympathies demand". The chancel walls were lined with panels of coloured marble, up to the level of the top of the reredos columns, and richly painted above this point. It was said that Scott "proposes to brighten all the roof with colour... and he fuses the vaulting into something transitional between Pointed and Italian. And he inserts tracery in all the round-headed windows, and the great ugly stable-like circles of the clerestory become roses under his plastic hand."

Stained glass by Clayton and Bell was installed, with a representation of Christ in Glory in the large circular east window. Its splays were enriched with inlaid and carved marble, with four heads in high relief enclosed in medallions. The other windows contained a series of stained glass images illustrating the life of Christ, with the crucifixion at the west end.

A further campaign of medievalising decoration was carried out in the late 1860s by Herbert Williams, who had worked with Scott on the earlier scheme. Williams built a three-bay cloister-like passage, with plaster vaults, on the south side of the building, and in the body of the church added richly painted decoration to Wren's columns and capitals. The reredos was enriched with inlaid marble, and the chancel was given new white marble steps and a mosaic floor of Minton’s tesserae and tiles. In what the Building News described as a "startling novelty", a circular opening was cut in the vault of each aisle bay and filled with stained glass, and skylights installed above.

Few original furnishings were retained in its Victorian re-imagining, but the 1672 font given by James Paul survived, although a new balustrade was added.

Recent history
A First World War memorial was unveiled beside the entrance to the church in 1920, featuring a bronze statue of St Michael by Richard Reginald Goulden. The memorial became a Grade II* listed building in December 2016.

The church escaped serious damage during the Second World War, and was designated a Grade I listed building on 4 January 1950. In 1960, the Victorian polychrome paintwork was replaced with a more restrained colour scheme of blue, gold and white.

A new ring of twelve bells, cast by Taylors of Loughborough, was installed in the tower in April 2011.

The church has one of the oldest sets of churchwarden's records in the City of London, which are now kept in the Guildhall Library.

The Book of Common Prayer, the King James Bible and the English Hymnal continue to be used in services. The church is a corporate member of the Prayer Book Society.

The church vestry hosts the annual ward mote and polling station for the City of London ward of Cornhill.

As a traditionalist parish that rejects the ordination/leadership of women, the church receives alternative episcopal oversight from the Bishop of Maidstone (currently Rod Thomas).

Rectors

Sperling the Priest 1133
John de Merham 1287
William de Wyholakesford 1321–1322
Henry de Makeseye 1330–1331
John de Wendland ????-1345
Thomas de Wallingford 1345
Richard Savage 1351-1357/8
Hugh de Denton 1366–1368
Richard Mitford ???? – 1371
Richard Atfelde 1371–1393
John Haseley 1393–1400
Thomas Whithede 1400–1407
William Bright 1407–1414
Peter Heynewick 1421–1426
Henry Woodchurch 1426–1432
Thomas Lisieux 1432–1447
William Lyeff 1447–1454
William Wytham 1454
Thomas Bolton 1472–1474
Henry Best 1474–1477
Peter Hussye 1477–1482
Martin Joynour 1482–1485
John Moore 1485–1503
John Wardroper 1503–1515
Peter Drayton 1515–1517
Rowland Phillips 1517–1538
Edward Stepham 1538–1545
John Willoughby 1545–1554
John Philpot 1562/3-1567
Richard Mathew 1567–1587
William Ashbold 1587–1622
George Carew 1622-1624/5
William Brough 1625–1642
Thomas Holl 1642/3-1645
Anthony Harford 1645–1646
John Wall 1646–1652
Peter Vincke 1652–1660
William Brough 1660–1664
John Meriton 1664–1704
Samuel Baker 1705–1749
Arnold King 1749–1771
Robert Poole Finch 1771–1784
Arthur Dawes 1784–1793
Thomas Robert Wrench 1793–1836
Thomas William Wrench 1836–1875
William Hunt 1875–1887
Alfred Earle 1888–1896
George Charles Bell 1896–1913
John Henry Joshua Ellison 1913–1945
George Frederick Saywell 1945–1956
Norman Charles Stanley Motley 1956–1980
John Scott 1981–1985
David Burton Evans 1986–1996
Gordon Reid 1997–1998
Peter Mullen 1998–2012
Stephen Platten 2014–2017
Charles Skrine 2017-2021

The Parish Clerk is Mr Rupert Meacher. The patrons of the living are (and have been since 1503) the Worshipful Company of Drapers.

Notable parishioners
John Stow, author of A Survey of London (1598)
Thomas Gray, the poet famous for his Elegy Written in a Country Churchyard, was born in a milliner's shop adjacent to St Michael's in 1716, and was baptised in the church.
Martin Neary, later organist of Westminster Abbey, was baptised in St Michael's.
Sir George Thalben-Ball, leading organist and choir director.
Sir Derek Pattinson, former general secretary to the General Synod of the Church of England.
Fay Weldon, the feminist writer, was a member of the congregation for some years.
Douglas Murray, media personality.

Organ

The organ, which includes historic pipework by Renatus Harris, Green, Robson, Bryceson, Hill and Rushworth and Dreaper, and was in 2010 restored by Nicholson & Co (Worcester) Ltd, has been awarded a Historic Organ Certificate of Recognition by the British Institute of Organ Studies.

List of organists

Isaac Blackwell 1684 – 1699
Walter Holt 1699 – 1704
Philip Hart 1704 – 1723
Obadiah Shuttleworth 1723 – 1734
Joseph Kelway 1734 – 1736 (afterward, organist of St Martin-in-the-Fields)
William Boyce 1736 – 1768 (also appointed Master of the King's Musick in 1755 and organist at the Chapel Royal in 1758)
Theodore Aylward Sr. 1769 – 1781 (Gresham Professor of Music 1771, and organist of St. George's Chapel, Windsor 1788)
Richard John Samuel Stevens 1781 – 1810
George William Arnull 1810 – 1849
Richard Davidge Limpus 1849 – 1875
Edward Henry Thorne 1875 – 1891
Williamson John Reynolds 1891 – 1900 (afterward, organist of St Martin in the Bull Ring, Birmingham)
George Frederick Vincent 1900 – 1916
Harold Darke 1916 – 1966
Richard Popplewell  1966 – 1979
Jonathan Rennert 1979 – current

List of assistant organists

Morley Whitehead (afterward, assistant organist of High Kirk of St Giles, Edinburgh, then Organist of Morningside Parish Church, Edinburgh)
Andrew Lucas (afterward, sub-organist of St Paul's Cathedral, then Master of the Music of St Albans Abbey
James Cryer (afterward, organ scholar of Westminster Abbey & St John's College, Cambridge
Adrian Lenthall (afterward, organ scholar of Westminster Abbey & Emmanuel College, Cambridge
John Hatton (then a student of the Royal College of Music)
Matthew Morley (currently assistant director of music, St Bride's, Fleet Street, London)
Lee Ward (currently director of music at Liverpool Cathedral)
Ross Cobb (director of music, Christ Church, Clifton Down and now director of Music, St. Andrew's Cathedral, Sydney)
Alistair Reid (after a spell in the US, he is now assistant organist of Coventry Cathedral)
Nigel Thomas (then a student of the Royal College of Music)
James Hills (currently director of music at Clifton College)
Jonathan Bunney (director of music at St Giles-in-the-Fields, London)
Andrew Earis (currently director of music at St Martin-in-the-Fields, London)
Duncan Ferguson (currently organist and master of the music of St Mary's Cathedral, Edinburgh (Episcopal))
Robert Smith (currently director of music at St Mary-at-Hill, London)
Gregory Drott (currently director of music and organist at St. Stephen's, Gloucester Road)

See also 

 List of churches and cathedrals of London
 List of Christopher Wren churches in London

Notes

External links

 St Michael's website

Anglo-Catholic church buildings in the City of London
Church of England church buildings in the City of London
Christopher Wren church buildings in London
17th-century Church of England church buildings
Rebuilt churches in the United Kingdom
Diocese of London
Grade I listed churches in the City of London